Butler Township is one of the nine townships of Montgomery County, Ohio, United States.  As of the 2010 census the population was 7,894.

Geography
Located in the northern part of the county, it borders the following townships and cities:
Monroe Township, Miami County - north
Vandalia - east
Dayton - southeast
Harrison Township - south
Clayton - southwest
Englewood - west
Union Township, Miami County - northwest

Three cities are located in what was originally parts of Butler Township:
Part of Dayton, the county seat of Montgomery County, in the northeast and a smaller portion in the southeast
Part of Union, in the northwest
Vandalia, in the east

Name and history
It is one of six Butler Townships statewide.

Butler Township was described in 1833 as having five gristmills, four saw mills, one fulling mill, two tanneries, five distilleries, and one woolen factory.

Government
The township is governed by a three-member board of trustees, who are elected in November of odd-numbered years to a four-year term beginning on the following January 1. Two are elected in the year after the presidential election and one is elected in the year before it. There is also an elected township fiscal officer, who serves a four-year term beginning on April 1 of the year after the election, which is held in November of the year before the presidential election. Vacancies in the fiscal officership or on the board of trustees are filled by the remaining trustees.

Trustees:

Missy Pruszynski (President)

Mike Thein

Bryson Jackson

Fiscal Officer: Gregory A. Brush

References

External links
Township website
County website

Townships in Montgomery County, Ohio
Townships in Ohio